Ameiva concolor is a species of teiid lizard endemic to Peru.

References

Ameiva
Reptiles described in 1924
Lizards of South America
Reptiles of Peru
Taxa named by Alexander Grant Ruthven